Chaetosalpinx is an ichnogenus of bioclaustrations (a type of trace fossil). Chaetosalpinx includes straight to sinuous cavities that are parallel to the host's axis of growth. The cavity is circular to oval in cross-section and it lacks a wall lining or floor-like  tabulae. They are common in tabulate and rugose corals from Late Ordovician to Devonian of Europe and North America.
They may have been parasites.

References

Trace fossils
Silurian animals
Devonian animals
Late Devonian animals